Great Bird Island is a tiny islet lying almost three kilometers north-east of Antigua. Measuring just , it is smaller than most city parks. It is a private island but open to the public.

Flora and Fauna 
The island is the only place on Earth where you can see an Antiguan racer (Alsophis antiguae) in the wild. The entire world population of this snake no longer lives on just the one island. Named by sailors who were amazed at the number of birds that they found living and nesting there, Great Bird Island is a miniature paradise. As well as being the last refuge of the Antiguan racer, it is also home to a variety of other endangered creatures including the near-threatened lizard Pholidoscelis griswoldi, brown pelicans (Pelecanus occidentalis), West Indian whistling ducks and red-billed tropicbirds (Phaethon aethereus).
Hundreds of black rats lived there until recently.

References

Uninhabited islands of Antigua and Barbuda
Private islands of Antigua and Barbuda
Saint Peter Parish, Antigua and Barbuda